Petr Matoušek (born 19 December 1949) is a Czech former cyclist. He competed at the 1972 Summer Olympics and the 1976 Summer Olympics.

References

External links
 

1949 births
Living people
Czech male cyclists
Olympic cyclists of Czechoslovakia
Cyclists at the 1972 Summer Olympics
Cyclists at the 1976 Summer Olympics
People from Teplice nad Bečvou
Sportspeople from the Olomouc Region